Blame It on My Youth is an album by Art Farmer's Quintet recorded in New York in 1988 and originally released on the Contemporary label.

Reception

Scott Yanow of Allmusic called it "one of the better Art Farmer recordings of the 1980s, which is saying a great deal, for the flugelhornist is among the most consistent of all jazz musicians...  It's an enjoyable and very successful outing". In addition to a maximum four-star rating, The Penguin Guide to Jazz awarded the album a "Crown" signifying a recording that the authors "feel a special admiration or affection for".

Track listing
 "Blame It on My Youth" (Edward Heyman, Oscar Levant) - 7:05
 "Fairy Tale Countryside" (Fritz Pauer) - 9:46
 "The Smile of the Snake" (Donald Brown) - 6:01
 "Third Avenue" (Clifford Jordan) - 8:16
 "Summer Serenade" (Benny Carter) - 6:16
 "Progress Report" (James Williams) - 4:32
 "I'll Be Around" (Alec Wilder) - 5:04

Personnel
Art Farmer - flugelhorn
Clifford Jordan - tenor saxophone, soprano saxophone
James Williams - piano
Rufus Reid - bass 
Victor Lewis - drums

References 

Art Farmer albums
1988 albums
Contemporary Records albums